Happening for Love is the debut solo album by former The La's bassist and Cast vocalist John Power.

It was released on June 30, 2003.

Track listing
All songs written by John Power.
 "Electrify" – 4:07
 "Paradise" – 4:04
 "Everyday Folk" – 3:25
 "Small Farm" – 3:31
 "TNT" – 4:13
 "Songbird" – 3:37
 "Mariner" – 4:58
 "Happening for Love" – 3:19
 "Change for Tomorrow" – 4:04
 "Viva" – 4:29
 "Island" – 4:09

Personnel
 John Power – guitar, vocals, mixing

Production
 John Leckie – producer, engineer, mixing
 Gus Shaw – mastering

Additional musicians
 Martyn Campbell – bass
 Paul Maguire – drums
 Duncan Ross – guitar
 Danny Roberts – harmonica

Additional personnel
 Hamish Brown – photography
 Stuart Green – design

References

John Power (musician) albums
Albums produced by John Leckie
2003 debut albums
Eagle Records albums